The 2019 Major League Baseball season began on March 20, while the regular season ended on September 29. It was the 150th anniversary of professional baseball, dating back to the 1869 foundation of the Cincinnati Red Stockings. The postseason began on October 1. The World Series began October 22 and ended October 30 with the Washington Nationals defeating the Houston Astros in seven games to win their first World Series championship. The entire schedule was released on August 22, 2018.

The 90th Major League Baseball All-Star Game was held on July 9 at Progressive Field, home of the Cleveland Indians. The American League won, 4–3, for its seventh straight victory.

This was the final season when anyone on the 40-man expanded roster could be used in games from September 1 through the end of the regular season (so-called September call-ups).

Schedule
As has been the case since 2013, teams were scheduled to play 19 games against each division opponent for a total of 76 games, and six or seven games against each team from the other two divisions for a total of 66 games. The primary inter-league match-ups were AL East vs NL West, AL Central vs NL East and AL West vs NL Central.

The season began on March 20 and 21 with the Oakland Athletics and the Seattle Mariners playing in Tokyo, Japan, at the Tokyo Dome.

Excluding international openers, March 28 was the earliest Opening Day in history. The previous earliest date was March 29 of the 2018 season.

The second annual Mexico Series of games featured four matchups during the season. The first featured the St. Louis Cardinals and the Cincinnati Reds at Monterrey, Mexico's Estadio de Béisbol Monterrey on April 13 and 14. The other series, also in Monterrey, featured two games between the Houston Astros and the Los Angeles Angels on May 4 and 5.

The Kansas City Royals faced the Detroit Tigers at TD Ameritrade Park in Omaha, Nebraska, on June 13, two days before the College World Series. This was the first MLB game played in the state of Nebraska.

The London Series featured the New York Yankees and Boston Red Sox at London Stadium in London, on June 29 and 30 making it the first regular season series played in London, under a two-year commitment.

The MLB Little League Classic at BB&T Ballpark in Williamsport, Pennsylvania, coinciding with the Little League World Series, returned to the schedule for the third straight year. It was played between the Chicago Cubs and Pittsburgh Pirates on August 18.

Standings

American League

National League

Postseason

Bracket

Managerial changes

General managers

Offseason

In-season

Field managers

Offseason

In-season

League leaders

American League

National League

Milestones

Batters
Paul Goldschmidt (STL):
Became the first player in Major League history to hit three home runs in either his first or second game with a new team. He accomplished the feat on March 29 against the Milwaukee Brewers.
Christian Yelich (MIL):
With a home run in the first inning against the St. Louis Cardinals on March 31, Yelich became the sixth player in Major League history to hit a home run in each of his team's first four games of the season.
With his 14th home run of the season on April 27 against the New York Mets, Yelich tied a Major League record for the most home runs in a single season before May 1. He tied the record that was set by Albert Pujols (2006) and Alex Rodriguez (2007).
Zack Greinke (HOU)/:
At age 35, became the oldest pitcher since 1957 to hit multiple home runs in the same game on April 2 against the San Diego Padres.
Became the first pitcher since 1930 to have at least five extra-base hits through the team's first 26 games on April 25 against the Pittsburgh Pirates. He also became the first pitcher since 1906 to hit for the cycle all in the month of April.
Chris Davis (BAL):
With his line drive out in the fifth inning against the Oakland Athletics on April 8, Davis set the Major League record with his 47th consecutive hitless at-bat. He broke the record that was set by Eugenio Vélez at the end of the 2010 season and the beginning of the 2011 season. Davis finally was able to put an end to the streak at 54 consecutive hitless at-bats with a single in the first inning against the Boston Red Sox on April 13.
Cody Bellinger (LAD):
Set the Major League record for total bases in March/April with 88 on April 26 against the Pittsburgh Pirates. He finished March/April with 97 total bases.
With his 14th home run of the season on April 28 against the Pittsburgh Pirates, Bellinger tied a Major League record for the most home runs in a single season before May 1. He tied the record that was set by Albert Pujols (2006), Alex Rodriguez (2007) and this year by Christian Yelich.
By collecting his 37th RBI on April 29 against the San Francisco Giants, Bellinger set the Major League record with the most RBI by May 1. He broke the record that was held by Mark McGwire and Juan Gonzalez, who both set the record in 1998.
Became the second player under the age of 25 in National League history to hit 30 home runs before the All-Star break on July 4 against the San Diego Padres. Willie Mays accomplished this feat as well in 1954.
Juan Soto, Víctor Robles and Carter Kieboom (WAS):
Became the first trio of teammates aged 21-or-younger in Major League history to hit a home run in the same game against the San Diego Padres on April 27.
Pablo Sandoval (SF):
On May 6 against the Cincinnati Reds became only the second player since 1900 to post a scoreless outing, hit a home run and steal a base in the same game, joining fellow Giant Christy Mathewson, who accomplished the feat on May 23, 1905.
Robinson Canó (NYM):
Recorded his 2,500th career hit against the San Diego Padres on May 7 with a double in the first inning. He became the 101st player, and sixth Dominican-born, to reach this mark.
Recorded his 550th career double in the eighth inning against the Chicago Cubs on June 21. He became the 31st player to reach this mark.
Joey Gallo (TEX):
With his 100th career home run, Gallo became the first player in Major League history to amass 100 home runs before reaching it in singles (93) on May 8 against the Pittsburgh Pirates.
Albert Pujols (LAA):
Recorded his 2,000th career RBI with a home run in the third inning against the Detroit Tigers on May 9. He becomes the third player to reach this mark, joining Hank Aaron and Alex Rodriguez.
Recorded his 650th career double in the third inning on July 7 against the Houston Astros. He became the eighth player to reach this mark.
Recorded his 650th career home run on July 28 against the Baltimore Orioles. He became the sixth player to reach this mark. With this home run, Pujols also became the first player in Major League history to hit at least 650 home runs and 650 doubles in their career.
With a single in the fourth inning on August 14 against the Pittsburgh Pirates, Pujols became the all-time hits leader among players born outside the United States, passing Adrián Beltré with career hit 3,167.
Trevor Story (COL):
Became the fastest shortstop in Major League history to hit his 100th career home run, doing so in his 448th game on May 24 against the Baltimore Orioles.
Austin Riley (ATL):
With his eighth home run of the season on June 1 against the Detroit Tigers, Riley joined Rhys Hoskins, Carlos Delgado and Trevor Story as the only players in Major League history to homer at least eight times through the first 16 games of a career. Riley also tied the mark for the most RBIs through his first 16 games, with 22 (done by Jim Greengrass and Mandy Brooks).
Edwin Encarnación (NYY)/:
Recorded his 400th career home run against the Los Angeles Angels on June 9. He became the 56th player to reach this mark.
Shohei Ohtani (LAA):
Became the first Japanese-born player in Major League history to hit for the cycle on June 13 against the Tampa Bay Rays.
Yordan Álvarez (HOU):
With his home run on June 15 against the Toronto Blue Jays, Alvarez tied a Major League record by hitting at least four home runs in his first five career games. In becoming the fourth player to achieve this mark, Álvarez joined Trevor Story (six in 2016), Yasiel Puig (four in 2013) and Mike Jacobs (four in 2005).
By knocking in two runs against the Oakland Athletics on July 22, Álvarez became the first player in Major League history to have 35 RBIs in his first 30 career games since runs batted in became an official statistic in 1920.
Charlie Blackmon (COL):
Set the Major League record for most hits in a four-game series by getting 15 hits against the San Diego Padres from June 13 to June 16. He broke the record that was set by Buck Jordan of the Boston Braves in 1934 and Bill White of the St. Louis Cardinals in 1961.
Pete Alonso (NYM):
With his 26th home run on June 22 against the Chicago Cubs, Alonso set the record for most homers by a National League rookie before the All-Star break. Cody Bellinger had set the mark in 2017. Hit his 30th home run on July 7 against the Philadelphia Phillies becoming the third rookie to have 30 home runs by the All-Star break. He joins Mark McGwire (1987) and Aaron Judge (2017) to reach this mark.
On August 18, Alonso hit his 40th home run, setting a National League rookie record previously set by Cody Bellinger in 2017.
Became the second rookie in Major League history to hit 50 home runs when he hit his 50th on September 20 against the Cincinnati Reds. He joins Aaron Judge who accomplished this in 2017.
Tied the Major League rookie record for most home runs in a season with his 52nd against the Atlanta Braves on September 27. He tied the record set by Aaron Judge in 2017.
Set the Major League rookie record for most home runs in a season with his 53rd, passing Judge in the process, also against the Atlanta Braves, on September 28.
Bryce Harper (PHI):
Became the first player in Major League history to have two milestone hits in one at-bat on July 3 against the Atlanta Braves. His at-bat in the sixth inning included his 1000th career hit and his 200th career home run.
Travis d'Arnaud (TB):
Became the first player in Major League history to homer three times in a game while catching and batting leadoff. He accomplished this against the New York Yankees on July 15.
Bo Bichette (TOR):
Became the first player in Major League history to record 10 extra-base hits within his first nine career games on August 6 against the Tampa Bay Rays.
Aristides Aquino (CIN):
Became the first rookie in Major league history to hit a home run in three consecutive innings on August 10 against the Chicago Cubs.
With his 13th home run on August 28 against the Miami Marlins, he became the first player in the modern era to reach 13 home runs in 100 career plate appearances.
Became the fastest player to reach 15 career home runs with his home run on September 2 against the Philadelphia Phillies. Aquino accomplished this in 122 plate appearances, breaking the record by Rhys Hoskins who did it in 135 plate appearances last season.
Rafael Devers (BOS):
Went 6-for-6 with four doubles against the Cleveland Indians on August 13, becoming the first player in Major League history to record six or more hits and four or more doubles in one game.
Ronald Acuña Jr. (ATL):
With his 30th stolen base on August 23 against the New York Mets, Acuña became the second-youngest player to join the game's 30–30 club. The only other player to join the 30-30 club before his 22-year-old season was Mike Trout, who accomplished this feat during his 20-year-old season in 2012.
With his 40th home run on September 19 against the Philadelphia Phillies, Acuña became the youngest in Major League history to hit at least 40 home runs and steal 30 bases in a season.
Eduardo Escobar (ARI):
Became the fourth switch-hitter in Major League history to hit at least 30 home runs, 20 doubles and 10 triples in the same season on August 29 against the Los Angeles Dodgers.
Mike Trout (LAA):
On August 31, Trout made history by becoming the youngest player (28 years, 24 days) to join the 200-homer 200-stolen base club. He achieved this feat against the Boston Red Sox with his 11th stolen base of the season, breaking the record that was previously held by Barry Bonds (28 years, 349 days).
Ketel Marte and Eduardo Escobar (ARI):
Became the first switch-hitting teammates in National League history to both hit 30+ home runs on September 4 against the San Diego Padres.
Eugenio Suarez (CIN):
With his 48th home run against the Chicago Cubs on September 18, Suarez set a new single-season home run record by a Venezuelan-born player. He broke the record set by Andres Galarraga in 1996.
Nelson Cruz (MIN):
Recorded his 400th career home run in the fourth inning against the Kansas City Royals on September 22. He became the 57th player, and tenth Dominican-born player, to reach this mark.
Adam Frazier (PIT):
Tied the Major League record for most doubles in a game by hitting four against the Chicago Cubs on July 1.

Pitchers

No-hitters
Mike Fiers (OAK):
Threw his second career no-hitter, and the 13th in franchise history, by defeating the Cincinnati Reds 2–0 on May 7. Fiers struck out six and walked two, throwing 83 of his 131 pitches for strikes. Fiers becomes the 35th pitcher with multiple no-hitters in his career, including the post-season. This was also the 300th no-hitter in Major League history.
Taylor Cole and Félix Peña (LAA):
Combined to throw the 11th no-hitter in franchise history by defeating the Seattle Mariners 13–0 on July 12. With every player wearing Tyler Skaggs's jersey number 45 in their first home game since his death on July 1, Cole and Pena allowed only one walk during the game in the 13th combined no-hitter in Major League history. Cole started the game and went two innings, throwing 13 of his 22 pitches for strikes. Pena went the last seven innings, walking one and striking out six. He threw 81 pitches and 52 were for strikes.
Aaron Sanchez, Will Harris, Joe Biagini, and Chris Devenski (HOU):
Combined to throw the 12th no-hitter in franchise history and the 14th combined no-hitter in Major League history by defeating the Seattle Mariners 9–0 on August 3. Sanchez struck out six and walked two, throwing 55 of his 92 pitches for strikes. Harris walked one while throwing 12 pitches, of which five were strikes. Biagini struck out one and walked one while throwing 22 pitches, of which 12 were strikes. Devenski struck out one; with eight of twelve pitches were strikes.
Justin Verlander (HOU):
Threw his third career no-hitter and the 13th no-hitter in franchise history in a 2–0 victory against the Toronto Blue Jays at Rogers Centre on September 1. Verlander struck out fourteen batters while allowing only one walk, throwing 79 of his 120 pitches for strikes. Verlander also became the first person in Major League history to throw multiple no-hitters at the same park. He also became the sixth player in Major League history to throw at least three no-hitters, joining Nolan Ryan, Sandy Koufax, Bob Feller, Larry Corcoran, and Cy Young.

Other pitching accomplishments
In the opening game between the Mets and the Nationals, Jacob deGrom (NYM) had 10 strikeouts and Max Scherzer (WAS) had 12. This was the second time in Opening Day history when both starting pitchers in the same game recorded ten or more strikeouts. The only other time this happened was on April 7, 1970, when Dave McNally of the Baltimore Orioles had 13 strikeouts in a complete-game win and Sam McDowell of the Detroit Tigers struck out 11 in  innings.
Merrill Kelly and Jon Duplantier (ARI):
Became the first teammates in Major League history to make their major league debuts in the same game, with one pitcher earning a win and the other earning a save on April 1 against the San Diego Padres.
Jacob deGrom (NYM):
Tied Bob Gibson for most consecutive quality starts in Major League history at 26 games, by pitching seven scoreless innings against the Miami Marlins on April 3. This came to an end in deGrom's next start against the Minnesota Twins on April 9.
Trevor Bauer (CIN)/:
Became the first pitcher in Major League history to go five-plus innings in back-to-back starts to begin a season and give up only one total hit on April 4 against the Toronto Blue Jays.
Shane Greene (ATL)/:
Became the fastest pitcher in Major League history to earn his seventh save by closing out a game April 7 against the Kansas City Royals. Greene accomplished this in his team's first ten games.
Taylor Clarke (ARI):
Became the first pitcher since 1969 to record a save and get a hit in his Major League debut on April 20 against the Chicago Cubs.
Adam Wainwright (STL):
Recorded his 150th career win with a victory against the Milwaukee Brewers on April 24. He became the 261st player to reach this mark.
Max Scherzer (WAS):
Recorded his 2,500th career strikeout by fanning Manuel Margot of the San Diego Padres on April 26. He became the 35th player to reach this mark.
For the month of June, posted an ERA of 1.00 and struck out 68 batters in 45 innings. He became the fourth pitcher in the live ball era (since 1920) with an ERA of 1.00 or lower and 68-plus strikeouts in a month. The others were Randy Johnson, Roger Clemens and Pedro Martinez.
CC Sabathia (NYY):
Recorded his 3,000th career strikeout by fanning John Ryan Murphy of the Arizona Diamondbacks on April 30. He became the 17th player, and third left-hander (joining Randy Johnson and Steve Carlton), to reach this mark.
Recorded his 250th career win with a victory against the Tampa Bay Rays on June 19. He became the 48th player to reach this mark.
Stephen Strasburg (WAS):
With his 1,500th strikeout on May 2 against the St. Louis Cardinals, Strasburg became the fastest pitcher in Major League history to reach this mark accomplishing it in 1272 innings. Chris Sale previously held the record in 1290 innings.
Pat Venditte (SF) and Sam Dyson (MIN)/:
Tied a Major League record by combining to hit four batters in the sixth inning of their game against the Cincinnati Reds on May 6. They tied a record that was set by the Pittsburgh Pirates on August 19, 1893.
Félix Hernández (SEA):
Recorded his 2,500th career strikeout by fanning Michael Chavis of the Boston Red Sox on May 11. He became the 36th player to reach this mark.
Chris Sale (BOS):
By striking out 17 Colorado Rockies in seven innings on May 14, Sale set a Major League record by striking out 17 or more batters in a start lasting seven innings or fewer.
Became the second pitcher in Major League history to record two immaculate innings in the same season by accomplishing this in the eighth inning on June 5 against the Kansas City Royals. Sale also did this on May 8 against the Baltimore Orioles. He joins Lefty Grove who did this during the 1928 season.
With his 200th strikeout on the season against the Los Angeles Angels on August 8, Sale became the fifth pitcher in Major League history to record 200-plus strikeouts in seven consecutive seasons. He joins Walter Johnson, Tom Seaver, Roger Clemens and Max Scherzer.
Recorded his 2,000th career strikeout by getting Oscar Mercado in the third inning on August 13 against the Cleveland Indians. He became the 83rd pitcher to reach this mark. Sale also became the fastest pitcher in Major League history to record 2,000 strikeouts. He accomplished this feat in 1,626 innings, breaking the record of 1,711 innings set by Pedro Martinez.
Ryan Pressly (HOU):
With his scoreless outing on May 16 against the Detroit Tigers, Pressly has made 38 straight scoreless appearances, tying the Major League record set by Craig Kimbrel in 2011. Pressly set the new record the very next night against the Boston Red Sox. Pressly's streak came to an end at 40 games on May 24 against the Boston Red Sox.
Zack Greinke (HOU)/:
Recorded his 2,500th career strikeout by fanning Franmil Reyes of the San Diego Padres on May 21. He became the 37th player to reach this mark.
Recorded his 200th career win with a victory against the Oakland Athletics on August 18. He became the 115th player to reach this mark.
Justin Verlander (HOU):
Became the first pitcher since 1908 to strikeout 15 batters and allow at least three homers in a game on June 12 against the Milwaukee Brewers.
Recorded his 3,000th career strikeout by fanning Kole Calhoun of the Los Angeles Angels for his sixth strikeout of the game in the bottom of the fourth inning on September 28, during his final start of the regular season. He became the 18th player in history to reach this mark. Verlander would go on to finish the game with 12 strikeouts, with his final one, against Calhoun in the sixth inning, making him the 19th pitcher in Major League history to record at least 300 strikeouts in a single season. Verlander also became only the second pitcher in Major League history to reach 3,000 career strikeouts and 300 strikeouts in a season in the same game, joining Randy Johnson who accomplished the same feat on September 10, 2000.
Cole Hamels (CHC):
Recorded his 2,500th career strikeout by fanning Iván Nova of the Chicago White Sox on June 18. He became the 38th player to reach this mark.
Greg Holland (ARI):
Recorded his 200th career save by closing out a victory against the Los Angeles Dodgers on June 24. He became the 51st player to reach this mark.
David Price (BOS):
Recorded his 150th career win with a victory against the Detroit Tigers on July 7. He became the 262nd player to reach this mark.
Gerrit Cole (HOU):
With his 200th strikeout of the season on July 22 against the Oakland Athletics, Cole became the second fastest to this mark in Major League history. Cole reached this mark in 133 innings. Randy Johnson holds the record by reaching this mark in 130 innings during the 2001 season.
Became the second pitcher in Major League history to strike out 14 or more batters in three consecutive games on September 8 against the Seattle Mariners. This was first accomplished in 1999 by Pedro Martinez.
Became the 18th pitcher in Major League history to notch 300 strikeouts in a season when he struck out Shin-Soo Choo of the Texas Rangers in the sixth inning on September 18.
Stevie Wilkerson (BAL):
Became the first position player in Major League history to earn a save (since it became official in 1969) by closing out the win on July 25 against the Los Angeles Angels. Wilkerson threw a perfect 16th inning to close out the win.
Yu Darvish (CHC):
Became the first pitcher since at least 1893 to have five consecutive starts with at least eight strikeouts and no walks. The streak ended on August 27 when Darvish had seven strikeouts and one walk in the Cubs' 5–2 win over the New York Mets.
Brian Moran (MIA):
Became the first pitcher in Major League history to strike out his brother in his Major League debut when he struck out Pirates third baseman Colin Moran on September 5.
Roberto Osuna (HOU):
Became the youngest player in Major League history to reach 150 career saves by closing out a victory on September 17 against the Texas Rangers. Osuna is 24 years old, breaking the mark set by Craig Kimbrel, who was 25 when he set the mark.
Kenley Jansen (LAD):
Recorded his 300th career save by closing out a victory against the San Diego Padres on September 25. He became the 30th player to reach this mark.
Gerrit Cole and Justin Verlander (HOU):
Became only the second pair of teammates to each record 300 or more strikeouts during the same season, joining Curt Schilling and Randy Johnson who accomplished the feat with the Arizona Diamondbacks during the 2002 season.

Miscellaneous
Major League Baseball:
In May, there were 1,135 home runs hit, which set a new Major League record for the most home runs in a month. The previous record was from August 2017, when there were 1,119 home runs hit. The record was broken again in June, with 1,142 home runs hit. The record was broken yet again in August, with 1,228 home runs hit.
A new Major League record for the most home runs in a season was set on September 11, when Jonathan Villar of the Baltimore Orioles hit a go-ahead three-run home run in the bottom of the seventh inning against the Los Angeles Dodgers. The home run was the 6,106th home run league-wide of the season, breaking the previous record of 6,105 home runs that was set two years earlier during the 2017 season. Major League Baseball finished with a total of 6,776 home runs.
For the 12th straight season, Major League Baseball set a new record for most strikeouts in a single season.
For the first time in Major League Baseball history, at least four teams (the Houston Astros, Los Angeles Dodgers, New York Yankees and Minnesota Twins) recorded 100 or more wins in the same season.
The World Series was the first best-of-seven postseason series in the history of the major North American sports where all seven games were won by the road team.
Los Angeles Dodgers:
On March 28, the Dodgers set a Major League record for most home runs (eight) on Opening Day, in their 12–5 win against the Arizona Diamondbacks. The Dodgers tied the Major League record for most home runs in a team's first six games with 17.
On April 17, the Dodgers tied a Major League record by hitting a home run in 32 straight home games against the Cincinnati Reds. A.J. Pollock hit the record tying home run in the sixth inning. The streak started, and only includes the regular season, on August 21, 2018. This tied the record that was previously held by the 1999 Colorado Rockies. The Dodgers set the new record their next home game on April 26 against the Pittsburgh Pirates on Cody Bellinger's home run in the first inning. The streak came to an end, at 33 consecutive games, the very next game against the Pirates.
Became the first team in Major League history to win two consecutive games on a walk-off home run by a rookie on June 22 against the Colorado Rockies. The following day, they would go on to win the game on another rookie walk-off homer to make it three in a row.
Became the first team in the live ball era (since 1920) to end a game on five consecutive walks on July 2 in a 5–4 win against the Arizona Diamondbacks.
Set the Major League record for most home runs in a five-game stretch with 22 home runs from August 11–16 (off on August 12).
Set the National League record for most home runs in a single season with 279 home runs. That's 30 more than the 2000 Houston Astros.
Elvis Luciano (TOR):
Is the first player in Major League history born in the 2000s. He made his debut on March 31 against the Detroit Tigers. He won his first game on April 28 against the Oakland Athletics.
Seattle Mariners:
Set a Major League record for hitting a home run in a record 15 straight games to open the season, breaking the mark set by the 2002 Cleveland Indians. Dee Gordon hit the home run in the sixth inning against the Kansas City Royals on April 11. The Mariners were able to extend the record to 20 straight games but were unable to hit a home run in a loss to the Cleveland Indians on April 17.
Edwin Jackson (TOR):
Set a Major League record for appearing in a game for his 14th Major League team with his first pitch to Giants' Joe Panik on May 15. He broke the record that he shared with Octavio Dotel.
San Diego Padres:
The Padres broke the record for the longest no-hitter drought with 8,020 games on May 16 against the Pittsburgh Pirates. The drought started with the team's inaugural game on April 8, 1969. They broke the record that was set by the New York Mets, that ended with Johan Santana's no-hitter in 2012.
Houston Astros:
With their win against the Boston Red Sox on May 18, the Astros became the third team in Major League history to have two winning streaks of at least 10 games before June 1 of a season, following the 1941 St. Louis Cardinals and 1955 Brooklyn Dodgers.
Became the first team in Major League All-Star history that three players from the same club got the first three hits for one team. This was accomplished by George Springer, Alex Bregman and Michael Brantley.
Became the first team in Major League history to hit six home runs in the first two innings of a game on September 9 against the Oakland Athletics.
Became the first team in Major League history to lead the majors in pitching strikeouts (1,671) and the fewest hitting strikeouts (1,166).
Toronto Blue Jays:
Upon the former making his Major League debut on May 24, Cavan Biggio (son of Craig Biggio) and fellow rookie Vladimir Guerrero Jr. became the first teammates in Major League history whose fathers were both members of the Baseball Hall of Fame.
Minnesota Twins:
Became the first team in Major League history to have five games with at least five home runs before the start of June after their game against the Seattle Mariners on May 18.
With their second eight-home-run day of the season on May 23 against the Los Angeles Angels, the Twins had hit 98 home runs in their first 49 games, matching the most hit by a team through its first 49 games in Major League history. They tied the record set by the 1999 Seattle Mariners and the 2000 St. Louis Cardinals.
On July 5, set the Major League record for most home runs before the All-Star break with 165 beating the record of 161 set last season by the New York Yankees. The Twins finished with 166 home runs at the All-Star break.
Became the first team in Major League history with nine 5-plus-home-run games in single season on July 25 against the Chicago White Sox. The following night, the Twins became the fastest team in Major League history to reach their 200th home run, doing so in 103 games, 19 games less than the 2005 Texas Rangers.
Set the Major League record for most road home runs in a season by hitting their 141st home run against the Chicago White Sox on August 29. They broke the record that was set in 2001 by the San Francisco Giants.
Set the Major League record for most home runs in a season by hitting their 268th home run against the Detroit Tigers on August 31. They broke the record set last season by the New York Yankees. The Twins finished the season with 307 home runs, which set a new Major League record.
With Jorge Polanco's 20th home run on August 31 against the Detroit Tigers, the Twins set the Major League record for most players with at least 20 home runs during the season. Polanco became the eighth Twin to reach this plateau, breaking the mark that was set held by seven teams, most recently by the 2018 Los Angeles Dodgers.
Became the first team in Major League history to have five players (Nelson Cruz, Max Kepler, Eddie Rosario, Mitch Garver and Miguel Sano) to hit at least 30 home runs in a season.
With Jonathan Schoop's home run on September 26 against the Detroit Tigers, the Twins became the first team in Major League history to hit 300 home runs in a season.
Baltimore Orioles:
Gave up their 100th home run of the season on May 21 against the New York Yankees. The Orioles pitching staff did it in 48 games, which was nine games faster than the previous fastest held by the 2000 Kansas City Royals.
Became the first team in Major League history to score at least 13 runs each in consecutive shutout games. Both games were against the Cleveland Indians on June 28 and 29.
Became the first team in Major League history to homer at least twice in 10 consecutive games on July 27 against the Los Angeles Angels.
Became the first team in Major League history to allow multiple home runs in 10 consecutive games on August 5 against the New York Yankees.
Set the record for most home runs allowed in a season by giving up their 259th on August 22 against the Tampa Bay Rays. Austin Meadows hit the home run in the third inning, breaking the mark that was set by the Cincinnati Reds during the 2016 season. The Orioles gave up 305 home runs to establish the new record.
New York Yankees:
On May 22 became the first team in Major League history to hit at least three home runs in six consecutive games in the same ballpark (Oriole Park at Camden Yards).
Set the Major League record for most consecutive games (28) with a home run on June 25 against the Toronto Blue Jays. They broke the record that was set in 2002 by the Texas Rangers. The streak came to an end at 31 games after not hitting a home run against the New York Mets on July 2.
In their season series against the Baltimore Orioles, the Yankees hit 61 home runs, a new Major League record.
Set the Major League record for most home runs in any month with their 59th home run against the Los Angeles Dodgers on August 26. This broke the record that was held by the Baltimore Orioles (May 1987) and the Seattle Mariners (May 1999). They finished August with 74 home runs.
Washington Nationals:
Became the first franchise in Major League history to hit back-to-back-to-back-to-back home runs on more than one occasion on June 9 against the San Diego Padres. They also accomplished this feat on July 17, 2017 against the Milwaukee Brewers. This was the ninth time in Major League history that four consecutive home runs were hit.
Arizona Diamondbacks:
Became the second team in Major League history to hit three straight home runs to start a game on the road on June 10 against the Philadelphia Phillies. The first team to accomplish this was the Milwaukee Brewers on September 9, 2007.
Three Major League firsts were also accomplished in this game:
The Diamondbacks became the first team in Major League history to hit eight home runs in a game and surrender eight home runs in another game (March 28 against the Los Angeles Dodgers) in the same season.
Back-to-back-to-back home runs by a team on three consecutive days. The Los Angeles Angels on June 8, the Washington Nationals on June 9 and the Diamondbacks on June 10.
Thirteen combined home runs in a single game.
Became the first team in the modern era (since 1900) to win a game that lasted nine or more innings while having just one baserunner, according to Elias Sports. This was accomplished on September 14 against the Cincinnati Reds.
The San Diego Padres and Colorado Rockies scored 92 runs during their four-game series from June 13 to June 16 to set a Major League record. They broke the record of 88 runs that was set in May 1929 by the Philadelphia Phillies and Brooklyn Robins.
Cincinnati Reds:
Against the Colorado Rockies on July 13, the Reds, according to Elias Sports, became the first Major League team in the modern era to collect five triples and at least three home runs in one game.
The game between the San Francisco Giants and Arizona Diamondbacks on August 16 was the first in National League history that each team hit at least six home runs.
Michael Lorenzen (CIN):
Became the first player since Babe Ruth on June 13, 1921 to earn the win, hit a home run and play in the field in the same game on September 4 against the Philadelphia Phillies.
Bruce Bochy (SF):
Became the 11th manager in Major League history to record 2,000 career victories during the Giants' 11–3 victory against the Boston Red Sox on September 18.

Awards and honors

Regular season

All-MLB Team
On December 10, Major League Baseball announced its first-ever All-MLB team. Players were selected through fan votes (50%) and votes from a panel of experts (50%). The winners were selected based on merit, with no set number of nominees per position and no distinction between leagues.

Other awards
The Sporting News Player of the Year Award: Mike Trout (LAA)
Comeback Players of the Year: Carlos Carrasco (CLE, American); Josh Donaldson (ATL, National)
Edgar Martínez Award (Best designated hitter): Nelson Cruz (MIN)
Hank Aaron Award: Mike Trout (LAA, American); Christian Yelich (MIL, National)
Roberto Clemente Award (Humanitarian): Carlos Carrasco (CLE)
Mariano Rivera AL Reliever of the Year Award (Best AL reliever): Aroldis Chapman (NYY)
Trevor Hoffman NL Reliever of the Year Award (Best NL reliever): Josh Hader (MIL)
Warren Spahn Award (Best left-handed pitcher): Patrick Corbin (WAS)

Monthly awards

Player of the Month

Pitcher of the Month

Rookie of the Month

Reliever of the Month

Home Field Attendance & Payroll

Uniforms

Changes
On November 16, 2018, the Miami Marlins unveiled a new logo, team colors, and uniform for 2019, as part of changes instituted by the team's new CEO Derek Jeter. The new design replaces one used since their 2012 move to Marlins Park and rebranding from the Florida Marlins to the Miami Marlins, and utilizes shades of red, blue, black, and slate.

On January 29, 2018, Major League Baseball stated that the Cleveland Indians had agreed to stop using their "Chief Wahoo" logo—which has attracted controversy as a stereotype of Native Americans—on their uniforms in 2019, as it was deemed to be "no longer appropriate for on-field use". The block C cap insignia will officially become the team's main logo; on November 19, 2018, the team unveiled new uniforms excluding the Chief Wahoo logo, as well as new hats with red brims for home games, a new red-colored home alternate jersey (marking the team's first red jersey since the 1970s), and sleeve patches commemorating their hosting of the 2019 All-Star Game. In order to maintain trademarks and prevent it from falling into the public domain, the logo will continue to be used on a limited amount of team merchandise.

All 30 teams wore patches this year on the right sleeve commemorating MLB's 150th anniversary. The patch was also featured on caps on Opening Day.

Anniversaries and special events

The following teams will wear commemorative patches for special occasions

Other uniforms

April 15: Players, managers and umpires wore #42, the 72nd anniversary of Jackie Robinson's debut in the majors.
May 27: All teams wore a uniform with a poppy which had the words "Lest We Forget" for Memorial Day.
June 29: The Orioles wore uniforms based on the Maryland state flag.
July 12: The Angels wore uniforms with the name "Skaggs" and the number 45 to remember Tyler Skaggs, who had died on July 1.
July 13: The Giants and Brewers wore Spanish language "Gigantes" and "Cerveceros" uniforms.
July 22: The Astros wore caps with the Apollo 11 logo to mark the 50th anniversary of the moon landing.
August 18: The Cubs and Pirates wore special caps and uniforms at the Little League World Series. The Cubs wore uniforms with the word "Cubbies" and the Pirates wore uniforms with the words "The Burgh". Players wore nicknames on their backs.
August 23 to 25: For the third straight year, there was a Players Weekend, an event for which all teams allowed players to showcase their passions, backgrounds and interests by putting their personal touches, including nicknames, on what they wear and the equipment they use. The teams wore either black or white uniforms with the home team choosing what color they wanted to wear during the weekend. The pitcher always wore a black hat, no matter what uniform color the team wore.
September 6: The Reds and Braves wore Spanish language "Los Rojos" and "Los Bravos" uniforms.
September 8 and 16: The Athletics wore Spanish language "Atléticos" uniforms.
September 14: The Giants wore black uniforms with orange "Gigantes" uniforms.

Throwbacks
To honor the 150th anniversary of the Cincinnati Red Stockings becoming the first professional baseball team, the Cincinnati Reds announced on November 5, 2018, that the team would wear fifteen throwback uniforms. They wore:
May 4 – 1902 throwbacks (the 150th anniversary of the Red Stockings' 1869 home opener)
May 5 – 1911 road throwbacks
May 19 – 1919 throwbacks
July 6 – 1939 throwbacks
July 7 – 1956 road throwbacks
July 21 – 1961 throwbacks
July 28 – 1967 throwbacks
August 11 – 1969 throwbacks
September 22 – 1999 throwbacks

The Pirates are continuing to wear 1979 "bumblebee" throwbacks on Sundays this season. The team wore mono-black uniforms July 20 as the 40th anniversary of the 1979 World Series-winning team was honored.

The Pirates and Brewers wore Negro leagues throwbacks June 1 and 7. The Pirates wore uniforms of the Pittsburgh Crawfords and the Brewers wore the uniforms of the Milwaukee Bears.

The Twins and Royals wore Negro leagues throwbacks June 23. The Twins wore 1908 uniforms of the St. Paul Colored Gophers, and the Royals wore 1942 uniforms of the Kansas City Monarchs.

The Mariners and Astros wore 1980s–1990s throwbacks June 29.

The Royals and Nationals wore 1969 throwbacks July 6. The Nationals wore the 1969 throwbacks of the Montreal Expos.

The Phillies wore mono-burgundy 1979 "Saturday Night Special" throwbacks July 27. They were only worn once, on May 27, 1979. The Braves wore 1979 throwbacks, as well.

The Braves wore 1970's throwbacks August 1 to 4.

The Mariners and Astros wore 1980s throwbacks August 2.

The Orioles and Astros wore 1989 throwbacks August 9.

The Angels wore 1970s California Angels throwbacks August 16.

Venues
This was the Texas Rangers' final season at Globe Life Park in Arlington (formerly known as the Ballpark in Arlington and Ameriquest Field), where the team played its final regular season home game with a 6–1 win over the New York Yankees on September 29 before moving to Globe Life Field in 2020.

The stadium of the Seattle Mariners was renamed T-Mobile Park for the mobile provider (including its magenta-pink logo color as part of the park's branding atmosphere), after Safeco's contract with the team to call the venue Safeco Field expired at the end of the 2018 season.

The home field of the San Francisco Giants had its fourth name in its history since opening in 2000, but its first name outside the same company, as Oracle will pay an unknown but significant amount for a twenty-year agreement to rename the former AT&T Park as Oracle Park.

Broadcast rights

Television

National
This was the sixth year of the current eight-year deals with Fox Sports, ESPN, and TBS. Fox aired eight weeks of baseball on Saturday Nights which led up to the 2019 Major League Baseball All-Star Game which also aired on Fox. Fox then televised Saturday afternoon games for the final four weeks of the season. FS1 televised games on Tuesday and on Saturday both during the afternoon and night. ESPN televised games on its flagship telecast Sunday Night Baseball as well as Monday and Wednesday nights. TBS televised Sunday afternoon games for the last 13 weeks of the regular season. Fox and ESPN Sunday Night Baseball telecasts were exclusive; all other national telecasts were subject to local blackout.

TBS televised the National League Wild Card Game, Division Series, and the Championship Series. ESPN televised the American League Wild Card. FS1 and MLB Network televised the American League Division Series. Fox and FS1 televised the American League Championship Series. The World Series will air exclusively on Fox for the 20th consecutive year.

Local
Under an agreement with the U.S. Department of Justice regarding Disney's acquisition of 21st Century Fox, the Fox Sports Regional Networks were required to be sold off to third parties by June 18, 2019. Fox also invoked a clause to give Yankee Global Enterprises the rights to buy their stake back in the YES Network. Including YES, the Fox Sports Regional Networks broadcast games for 15 of the 30 MLB teams. On March 8, YES was sold to a consortium including Yankee Global Enterprises, Amazon, and Sinclair Broadcast Group for $3.5 billion. Then on May 3, Sinclair and Entertainment Studios agreed to purchase the rest of the Fox Sports Regional Networks. The networks continued to use the Fox Sports branding for the rest of the regular season under a transitional license agreement.

WGN-TV broadcasts of Chicago Cubs and White Sox games concluded at the end of the season. WGN held the local broadcast television rights of both teams since 1948. The network's final telecasts took place on September 28 (Cubs) and September 29 (White Sox). Effective with the 2020 season, Cubs games will move exclusively to the new Marquee Sports Network, while White Sox games will air full-time on NBC Sports Chicago.

Radio

Local
The New York Mets moved from iHeartMedia's WOR (710) to Entercom's WCBS (880), returning the team to the fold of the former CBS Radio New York cluster after five years with WOR (the team previously had a decades-long association with WFAN). However, the team's radio network throughout New York State was dissolved before the season, leaving WCBS the only station broadcasting the team's games.

National
 ESPN Radio will air its 22nd season of national coverage, including Sunday Night Baseball, Saturday games, Opening Day and holiday games, the All-Star Game, and Home Run Derby, and the entire Major League Baseball postseason.

Digital
MLB's contract with Facebook Watch has been further downsized, now only consisting of six games (reduced from 25). In addition, the games will no longer be exclusive to the service, and subject to blackout in-market. The league also reached a new digital partnership with the streaming service DAZN, who now airs a daily studio program, ChangeUp, which features live look-ins on games in progress.

In mid-July, MLB and Google announced that 13 games will air exclusively on YouTube, produced by MLB Network.

Retirements
The following players and managers retired from the start of 2019 season through Opening Day of the 2020 season:

Bruce Bochy – February 18 that he will retire from managing the San Francisco Giants at the end of the season
Ichiro Suzuki – March 21
Jason Hammel – March 23
Craig Gentry – May 2
Jake Peavy – May 5, but had not pitched professionally since 2016
James Loney – May 10
Koji Uehara – May 19, but had not pitched in the majors since 2017
Sean Burnett – May 28
Matt den Dekker – June 7
Alex Meyer – June 25
Cody Decker – July 7
Chris Stewart – July 12
Kirk Nieuwenhuis – July 12
Troy Tulowitzki – July 25
Danny Farquhar – July 31
Ty Kelly – August 24
Ned Yost – September 23 that he will retire from managing the Kansas City Royals at the end of the season
Brian McCann – October 9
David Freese – October 12
CC Sabathia – October 21
Mike Olt – October 25
Michael Saunders – October 25, but had not played professionally since 2017 
Kristopher Negrón – November 12
Clint Hurdle – November 13 that he is retiring from managing
Koda Glover – December 2
Ian Kinsler – December 20
Carlos Gomez – January 16, 2020
Tony Barnette – January 28, 2020
Peter Bourjos – January 30, 2020
Curtis Granderson – January 31, 2020
Mike Dunn – February 4, 2020
Kendrys Morales – February 7, 2020
Martín Prado – February 12, 2020
Jeremy Hellickson – February 14, 2020
Lonnie Chisenhall – February 21, 2020
Tom Koehler – March 2, 2020
A. J. Reed – March 4, 2020
Evan Gattis – March 30, 2020
Mark Reynolds – April 9, 2020
Steve Pearce – April 14, 2020
Rob Wooten – April 18, 2020
Ryan O'Rourke – June 8, 2020
Denard Span – June 8, 2020
Chad Bettis – June 25, 2020
Blake Trahan – June 28, 2020
Brandon Guyer – July 6, 2020
Devin Mesoraco – July 10, 2020
George Kontos – July 20, 2020

Retired numbers
Adrián Beltré had his #29 retired by the Texas Rangers on June 8. It was the fifth number retired by the franchise.
Joe Mauer had his #7 retired by the Minnesota Twins on June 15. It was the ninth number retired by the franchise.
Michael Young had his #10 retired by the Texas Rangers on August 31. It was the sixth number retired by the franchise.

See also
2019 in baseball
2019 KBO League season
2019 Nippon Professional Baseball season

References

External links
2019 Major League Baseball season schedule

 
Major League Baseball seasons